Rising Star is the second Indian version of the international franchise series Rising Star, a reality television singing competition. This is first time when Rising Star does not come with any present sponsor. This season earlier had an age limit of 4–13 years but when singers more than 13 years of age came for audition, the channel decided to change the age limit to 4 years and above. It is based on the Israeli singing competition HaKokhav HaBa (meaning The Next Star) created by Keshet Broadcasting Ltd.

The program format lets the viewers vote for contestants live via the television channel's mobile app. The show premiered on 20 January 2018 on Colors TV. This is the first reality television show in India which involves Live Audience Voting through Voot App.

Popular playback singer and music director Shankar Mahadevan, playback singer and actor Monali Thakur and actor-singer Diljit Dosanjh return as the experts in the show.

The show is hosted by TV Actor  Ravi Dubey. 
The winner of Rising Star Season 2 is Hemant Brijwasi.

Format
In contrast to other singing competition TV shows which feature a cast of celebrity judges, Rising Star features a cast of celebrity experts and considers the viewers at home the judges. During each performance, the audience at home is able to decide in real time whether or not a contestant is sent through to the next round by using a mobile voting app.

While the viewers at home are considered the "judges", the expert panelists also may influence the vote but with continuously decreasing percentage votes over the total public vote and not exceeding 5% of the total voting power.

The Auditions
The first round where the acts are individually called to perform. As a reportage of the announced performer is shown, viewers are invited to register for voting for that specific act. Following a countdown of three seconds, the candidate has to start performing behind a screen called "The Wall".

With start of performance, the voting kicks in. Registered voters have the option of voting just "Yes" or "No". Non-votes are also considered "No" votes. If an expert votes "Yes", another 5% is added to the tally of the contestant. The contestants also see random photos of voters in their favour. Faces of panelists voting "Yes" are also shown in larger frames.

Once the contestant reaches 80% of "Yes" votes, the wall is raised and the contestant goes to the next round of the competition.

The Duels
Contestants who make it through the auditions are paired by the judges to face off in a duel. The first contestant sings with the wall up and sets the benchmark for the second contestant. The second contestant sings with the wall down. If the second contestant betters the first contestant's vote total, the wall rises and the second contestant was through to the next round while the first contestant is eliminated; if the second contestant fails to raise the wall, the second contestant is eliminated and the first contestant goes through.

Series details

The Live Auditions
The Live auditions began on 20 January 2018 and went on till 4 February 2018.

Duels Ki Takkar 
The top 31 scorers from the auditions moved on to the second round named 'Duels Ki Takkar' which began on 10 February 2018. The contestants who qualify from this round move on to the quarterfinals.

Episode 7: 10 February 2018
Guests: Manish Paul and Iulia Vântur

Episode 8: 11 February 2018 
Guest: Sukhwinder Singh

Episode 9: 17 February 2018 
Guest: Gurdas Mann

Episode 10: 18 February 2018 
Guest: Sonakshi Sinha & Raftaar

India's Favourite 16 + Duets Challenge
The Top 16 contestants compete in this round. Eight teams of two perform in duets. The first team perform with the wall up and set the target percentage. The next teams perform with the wall down and attempt to beat the target score. The duo with the least score move to the Red Sofa (unsafe zone). The team with the lowest score gets eliminated.

Episode 11: 24 February 2018 
Guest: Richa Sharma

Tribute to Sridevi
The Top 14 contestants compete in this round. As the round progresses, the contestant who receives fewest votes at that point of the competition moves to the Red Sofa. At the end of the episode, the contestant who sits on the Red Sofa gets eliminated.

Episode 12: 3 March 2018 
 Guest: Alka Yagnik

Episode 13: 4 March 2018 
Guest: Kavita Krishnamurthy

Hero No. 1 (Ep14) & Salaam-E-Ishq (Ep15)
The Top 12 contestants compete in this round. As the round progresses, the contestant who receives fewest votes at that point of the competition moves to the Red Sofa. At the end of the episode, the contestant who sits on the Red Sofa gets eliminated.

Episode 14: 10 March 2018 
 Guest: Govinda

Episode 15: 11 March 2018 
 Guest: Tiger Shroff and Disha Patani

Guru Sishya (Ep16) & Bachpan Ke Suhane Din (Ep17)
Wild Card Twist: Some of the eliminated contestants were brought back for another chance. Raenit Singh, Aman Biswal & Chetan Brijvasi.

The Top 12 contestants compete in this round. As the round progresses, the contestant who receives fewest votes at that point of the competition moves to the Red Sofa. At the end of the episode, the contestant who sits on the Red Sofa gets eliminated.

Episode 16: 17 March 2018 
 Guest: Rani Mukerji
WILD CARD

Top 12

Episode 17: 18 March 2018 
 Guest: Shaan & Manish Paul

Rekha Special
The Top 10 contestants compete in this round. As the round progresses, the contestant who receives fewest votes at that point of the competition moves to the Red Sofa. At the end of the episode, the contestant who sits on the Red Sofa gets eliminated.

Episode 18: 24 March 2018 
 Guest: Rekha

Episode 19: 25 March 2018 
 Guest: Season One Contestants

Top 8
The Top 8 contestants compete in this round. As the round progresses, the contestant who receives fewest votes at that point of the competition moves to the Red Sofa. At the end of the episode, the contestant who sits on the Red Sofa gets eliminated.

Episode 20: 31 March 2018 
 Guest: Udit Narayan

Episode 21: 1 April 2018

Ticket To Finale 
The contestants compete to earn a direct entry to the finale week. In each episode, the contestant sitting on Golden Sofa (the contestant with the highest score) will move on to compete for the Ticket To Finale.

Episode 22: 7 April 2018

Episode 23: 8 April 2018

Face-off for the Ticket to Finale 

The two top scorers of Saturday and Sunday episode participate in a face-off round.

Finale Week

Episode 24: 14 April 2018 
Guest: Alia Bhatt
The Top 5 contestants except for Ticket to Finale winner Hemant Brijwasi were divided into two batches. Batch A- Zaid Ali, Chetan Brijwasi & Vishnumaya Ramesh and Batch B- Akhtar Brothers & Rohanpreet Singh. The contestant with the lowest score in each batch will be eliminated, making the Top 4.

Grand Finale

Episode 25: 15 April 2018
The Top 4 finalists compete in the first round. The Top 3 contestants proceed to the Face-off round.

Final Face-off:

Color key
 Winner
 1st Runner-up
 2nd Runner-up

References

2018 Indian television seasons
Rising Star (Indian TV series)